Hunting Lodge Mass Grave may refer to:

Hunting Lodge Mass Grave (Knezdol)
Hunting Lodge Mass Grave (Sušak)